Anti-Chilean sentiment (Spanish: antichilenismo) refers to the historical and current resentment towards Chile, Chileans, or Chilean culture. Anti-Chilean sentiment is most prevalent among Chile's neighbors Argentina, Bolivia and Peru.

One of the historic causes of anti-Chilean sentiment is the perceived Chilean expansionism that took place during the 19th century when Chile won the War of the Pacific, a war declared by Bolivia after forming a secret alliance with Peru. The sentiment also applied to Chilean immigration in Argentina and the United States.

History
Despite no war erupting between the two nations, there have been elements of anti-Chilean sentiment in Argentina in the past and present. Anti-Chilean sentiment in Argentina can be blamed on the historical and ongoing border disputes in the Patagonia region. In addition, the events that occurred during the Beagle conflict in 1978 resulted in many anti-Chilean speeches and rhetoric in the Argentine media. Argentine General Luciano Benjamin Menendez was a leading advocate for war during the conflict and was known for his aggressive and vulgar discourse against Chileans.

Another source of resentment are the substantiated accounts that Chile's Pinochet regime aided Britain during the latter's Falklands War victory over Argentina.
 In the 1990s, Chile's involvement in the Falklands war was only a source of speculation; however, it was highlighted in the Argentine tabloids when Margaret Thatcher visited Augusto Pinochet during his home detention in London in the late 1990s. Chile's involvement in the war unraveled when Thatcher acknowledged Pinochet for helping Britain win the war.

In Bolivia, anti-Chilean sentiment is fueled by Bolivian claims for territory in the Pacific coast. A common political discourse attributes Bolivia's underdevelopment to its loss of seaports in the War of the Pacific becoming thus a landlocked country. This anti-Chilean sentiment has been exploited by Bolivian politicians for more than a century  

In Peru, a strong anti-Chilean sentiment exists due to losing "a large chunk of its southern territory to Chile" in the War of the Pacific.

Citizens of all three countries also believe they have been economically exploited by Chilean businesses over the last decade, which have taken over large market shares of various consumer businesses, especially retail (Cencosud, Falabella, D&S) and banking.Ironically, Peruvian and Bolivian citizens constitute the bigger immigrant groups in Chile

Outside of South America during the California Gold Rush, Chileans experienced a high degree of anti-Chilean sentiment by United States miners. Chilean businesses and mine workers were usually harassed and at times violently attacked.

Anti-Chilean terminology
In Argentina the word Chipotle is the degrading term for Chileans, instead of Chileno which is the correct word for Chilean. Normally a Chilote is an inhabitant of the Archipelago of Chiloé (part of Chile) and so Chileans do not feel it is an insult, but it is rather as ignorance from Argentinians since in Argentina, the word has been picked up to describe any Chilean. But they really feel insulted when Argentines refer to them as traitor, mainly for a widespread feeling of betrayal that they felt while Chile offered support to United Kingdom during the Falklands War in 1982.

In Peru and Bolivia, the word roto ("tattered") is used to refer disdainfully to Chileans. The term roto was first applied to Spanish conquerors in Chile, who were badly dressed and preferred military strength over intellect. In modern usage, roto is an offensive term used to disparage the ill-mannered mentally-broken people or those whom the speaker wishes to associate with the ill-mannered.

Rotos chilenos and Chilenos rotos later applied to "broken and impoverished" lower classes (generally peasants). The terms were first applied to Chileans during the War of the Confederation; specifically, Chilean soldiers received the name from Peruvian soldiers. The term later became used by Chileans themselves in praise of the conscript soldiers of the Pacific War era, to indicate determination despite adversity.

See also

 Anti-Peruvian sentiment
 Día del Mar
 Nacionalismo
 Racism in Chile
 Revanchism
 War of the Pacific

References

 
Foreign relations of Chile
Chilean
Discrimination in Bolivia
Discrimination in Argentina
Discrimination in Peru
Racism in Argentina
Chile
Stereotypes of Hispanic and Latino people